Henry "Tippen" Johansen (21 July 1904 – 29 May 1988) was a Norwegian footballer who played as a goalkeeper for Vålerenga. He later managed the club.

Football

Playing career

Club career
At club level, he played for Vålerenga from 1923–46.

International career
Johansen made his debut for the national team in 1926 and played his last match in 1938. He participated in the 1936 Summer Olympics in Berlin, where Norway won a surprising bronze medal. He was also the Norwegian goalkeeper at the 1938 FIFA World Cup.

Coaching career
He managed Vålerenga two times; once in 1944, the second in 1949.

Other sports
"Tippen", also active in ski jumping, was awarded Egebergs Ærespris in 1938. He also practised ice hockey and bandy to a certain extent.

His autobiography, På vakt i Norges mål, was published in 1941.

References

External links
Profile at databaseolympics.com

1904 births
1988 deaths
Footballers from Oslo
Norwegian footballers
Norway international footballers
Norwegian male ski jumpers
Association football goalkeepers
1938 FIFA World Cup players
Olympic footballers of Norway
Olympic bronze medalists for Norway
Footballers at the 1936 Summer Olympics
Vålerenga Fotball players
Vålerenga Fotball managers
Olympic medalists in football
Medalists at the 1936 Summer Olympics
Norwegian autobiographers
Norwegian football managers
20th-century Norwegian people